Donald Stewart Bandy (born July 1, 1945) is a former American football offensive lineman in the National Football League. He played professionally for the Washington Redskins.

Early life
Bandy was born in South Gate, California and played prep football at Lynwood High School in Lynwood, California. He played college football at Compton Community College and the University of Tulsa.

Professional career
Bandy was drafted by the Washington Redskins in the sixth round of the 1967 NFL Draft. He played in the 1967 NFL season and the 1968 NFL season.

Life after the NFL
After leaving the NFL, Bandy served as head coach for Yucca Valley High School in Yucca Valley, California. He is the offensive line coach for Taft College in Taft, California, and teaches history and geography at Taft.

References

External links 
 databaseFootball.com
 Pro-Football-Reference.Com
 The Pro Football Archives

1945 births
Living people
American football offensive guards
Tulsa Golden Hurricane football players
Washington Redskins players
People from South Gate, California
Players of American football from California
Sportspeople from Los Angeles County, California
People from Taft, California
Taft Cougars football players
Compton Tartars football players